Humphrey Stafford may refer to:

Stafford of Hooke & Southwick
Humphrey Stafford (died 1413), of Southwick, Wiltshire & Hooke, Dorset
Humphrey Stafford (died 1442), of Hooke, Dorset ("With the Silver Hand")
Humphrey Stafford, 1st Earl of Devon, 1st Baron Stafford of Southwick (1439?–1469)

Stafford of Grafton
Humphrey Stafford (died 1419), of Grafton, Worcestershire
Humphrey Stafford (died 1450), of Grafton, Worcestershire
Humphrey Stafford (died 1486), of Grafton, Worcestershire

Stafford of Stafford Castle
Humphrey Stafford, Earl of Stafford (1425?–1458), of Stafford Castle, Staffordshire
Humphrey Stafford, 1st Duke of Buckingham (1402–1460), of Stafford Castle, Staffordshire

See also

Stafford (surname)

Humphrey (disambiguation)
Stafford (disambiguation)